"Too Little Too Late" is a song by American singer JoJo from her second studio album, The High Road (2006). It was written by Billy Steinberg, Josh Alexander and Ruth-Anne Cunningham, and produced by the former two with Da Family Records founder Vincent Herbert. The song was released as the album's lead single on July 24, 2006. A power ballad, "Too Little Too Late" is a pop and R&B breakup song about a girl who struggles about dealing with her first love as she refuses to reconcile with her ex-boyfriend despite his efforts to convince her. Its composition and theme about an unsuccessful relationship have drawn comparisons to JoJo's 2004 debut single, "Leave (Get Out)" from her previous debut album.

Alexander began writing the song on his own before being joined by Steinberg, a veteran songwriter, and Cunningham, a new singer-songwriter at the time who had just recently moved to the United States from Ireland, to complete it. Although Cunningham always envisioned the song being recorded by JoJo, the songwriters had considered offering "Too Little Too Late" to American girl group The Pussycat Dolls before it was forwarded to Blackground Records upon learning that the record label was recruiting new material for JoJo's then-upcoming sophomore album, two years after it had been written. JoJo decided to record "Too Little Too Late" to express how much she had matured since the release of her self-titled debut album in 2004, having experienced both her relationship and first broken heart since that time, and personally selected the track to be the album's first single.

The song has earned very positive reviews from music critics, who praised its composition, mature themes and JoJo's vocal performance; some critics and media publications have included it on their rankings of the best breakup songs. Commercially, the song proved to be an international success, reaching the top-six in six countries in addition to the United States. When "Too Little Too Late" rose from number 66 to number three on the Billboard Hot 100 chart, it broke singer Mariah Carey's record for the largest jump to a top-three spot in the chart's history, which Carey had previously achieved with her 2001 single "Loverboy". However, the record was ultimately broken by Kelly Clarkson's "My Life Would Suck Without You", which jumped from number 97 to number one on the issue dated February 7, 2009.

Commercially, "Too Little Too Late" remains her most successful single to-date. By becoming a global hit, the song also benefited Cunningham's career as a songwriter. Directed by Chris Robinson, the song's music video features a soccer theme, inspired by both JoJo's appreciation for the sport and her relationship with then-boyfriend Freddy Adu, a professional soccer player. Soccer player Mike Zaher, junior defender for the UCLA Bruins at the time, portrays JoJo's boyfriend in the music video, which also features appearances by the rest of the soccer team.

Writing and recording
"Too Little Too Late" was written by songwriters Billy Steinberg and Josh Alexander, and singer-songwriter Ruth-Anne Cunningham. Alexander began writing "Too Little Too Late" on his own before Steinberg joined him to complete it, particularly contributing lyrics and a bridge to the music Alexander had already composed for the song's verses and chorus. Steinberg identified "Too Little Too Late" as one of the few songs in his career to which he contributed only after a portion of it had been written, with Alexander introducing the song to him after he had already conceived its title, as well as some of the ballad's lyrics and melody, admitting that Steinberg essentially "helped him finish writing that song and that lyric." Born in Ireland, "Too Little Too Late" was one of the first songs Cunningham was hired to write professionally after moving to Los Angeles, California from Dublin at the age of 17. Cunningham's manager at the time, Eamonn Maguire, had introduced her to Steinberg a few weeks after she relocated from Ireland. After hearing Cunningham perform one of her original songs, Steinberg invited her to co-write "Too Little Too Late", which they successfully completed by the following day during a writing session with Alexander. Upon finishing the song, Cunningham felt that it was most suitable for JoJo but the songwriters lacked the necessary contacts and resources to forward it to her at the time.

Two years followed before the song was finally recorded, during which the songwriters had considered giving it to girl group The Pussycat Dolls. Upon learning that Bruce Carbone, executive vice president of A&R at Universal Records, was interested in obtaining new material for JoJo's then-upcoming second studio album, Steinberg sent a demo recording of "Too Little Too Late" to Carbone, who immediately expressed how much he liked the song. Steinberg and Alexander were then introduced to record producer Vince Herbert, founder of Da Family Records, who invited the songwriters to co-produce the song alongside him. Blackground then flew Steinberg and Alexander out to New York, where they began producing the track before recording JoJo's vocal's in September 2005.

"Too Little Too Late" was one of the first prospective songs from the album that Herbert played for JoJo. The singer claims she wanted to record the song as soon as she heard it for the first time, elaborating, "When my team heard that song, they knew I could hit the sweet spot, musically and in terms of subject matter." According to Vibe, the overall more mature, personal sentiment of the album prompted her to record "Too Little Too Late", having experienced both her first love and first heartbreak since the release of her self-titled debut album. The song was recorded at both Cryptic Studios in Los Angeles, California and Sony Music Studios in New York, New York. The songwriters got along both with JoJo and her mother Diana Levesque, who is also her manager, so well that they later returned to the studio to co-write a second song for the album with JoJo herself, entitled "How to Touch a Girl". In regards his musical style, JoJo described Steinberg as "more of a classic writer and producer." Having previously written several successful singles throughout the 1980s and 1990s for artists such as Madonna, Cyndi Lauper, The Bangles, Whitney Houston and Heart, Steinberg, aged 56 at the time, realized he is older than JoJo (15) and Alexander (24) combined while working in the recording studio with the two younger artists but didn't find it difficult to write lyrics appropriate for them, explaining, "I think that the part of me that writes lyrics isn’t really old or young ... I think the lyrics flow out in a way that has an honesty to it." On the difference between writing for younger versus older artists, Steinberg explained "you don't really know it's for somebody younger ... I've almost never really sat down and said, 'I'm going to try to write one that would be good for somebody younger.' I just write a song, and then if somebody younger likes it, then they sing it."

Release 
JoJo claims that she knew she wanted the song to be the album's first single from the moment she recorded it, announcing a pending release date of either August or September 2006 in April 2006. "Too Little Too Late" was ultimately released as the lead single from The High Road on August 15, 2006, via the Da Family/Blackground/Universal Records. "Get It Poppin'" was released alongside the single as a B-side. That same year, a CD single was released in Europe that, in addition to the main track, includes an instrumental version, two remixes ("Full Phatt Remix Feat Tah Mac" and "Full Phat Remix"), and the music video. "Too Little Too Late" is a more R&B-leaning track than Steinberg and Alexander's previous work, which had tended to be more pop rock-oriented. Writing the song in a more urban contemporary style was a conscious decision the songwriters made after realizing pop rock songs they had written for artists such as FeFe Dobson and The Veronicas were not being particularly embraced by contemporary radio stations in the United States; Steinberg elaborated, "I enjoy writing in all different styles. But I particularly enjoy hearing my songs on the radio, and these days pop radio is playing much more urban ... So there’s a lot more gratification in writing a song for an artist like JoJo that radio embraces." Based on this revelation, Steinberg and Alexander decided that they would be writing more pop-R&B songs upon hearing feedback from listeners complimenting them that "'Too Little Too Late' is more of a real song and not just a record." Cunningham heard JoJo's rendition for the first time on the radio during a cab ride in New York, during the playing of which she screamed from excitement.

Numerous mixes have been produced since the track's release in July 2006. Notable mentions are Full Phat, Josh Harris, and Raul Rincon. A remix of this song is featured on the dance video game Dance Dance Revolution Hottest Party. A Spanish version of the song was released on select non-US editions of The High Road.

Music and lyrics 

"Too Little Too Late" is a pop and R&B breakup song about a girl ending a relationship with a boy who has mistreated her; she refuses to resume or salvage their relationship even though he begs her for a second chance. Performed at a moderately slow tempo of 80 beats per minute, the song lasts a duration of three minutes and forty seconds (3:40). Beginning "Come with me/Stay the night", Bob Waliszewski of Plugged In identified "Too Little Too Late" as a song in which the protagonist "rejects a smarmy guy's game-playing advances". A power ballad, the track opens with a quiet verse before progressing into "a loud, sweeping chorus." Kelefa Sanneh, music journalist for The New York Times, observed that production-wise, the single features "airy synthesizers and synthetic-sounding strings" as opposed to loud guitars. Incorporating teen pop influences, JoJo performs several R&B-style arpeggios throughout the ballad, while her vocal range on the track spans three octaves, from D3 to E6. JoJo herself explained that the track discusses moving on from one's first heartbreak, calling it a "big song" about expressing disappointment in a first love that is not as angry-sounding as her debut single "Leave (Get Out)". Contributing to HuffPost, Sam Lansky concurred that the single is "more restrained but no less bitter" than "Leave (Get Out)" while remaining "a guitar-driven sigh of impotent resignation." Musically, JoJo identified "Too Little Too Late" as a pop song into which R&B elements had been incorporated using various harmonies and chord progressions, "but still kept it rock in the hook when it explodes." Robert Copsey of Digital Spy cited elements of power pop in the song, similar to "Leave (Get Out)". Instrumentally, the track also incorporates both acoustic and electric guitars.

AXS contributor Jason Burke summarized that, in "Too Little Too Late", JoJo refuses "to be a slave to a conditional or convenient relationship", realizing she is stronger on her own despite sometimes experiencing temptations to relent due to the fact that her former partner continues to know "all the right things to say". Identified as a breakup anthem, "Too Little Too Late" features an empowering message to which most women can relate, despite their age. According to Max Goldberg of Complex, the break up song narrates "The story of a fed-up JoJo curbing some guy who wasn't up to snuff", with the artist taking a different approach to dealing with teenage heartbreak that does not involve crying about the situation to her mother. Spin's Brian Josephs similarly remarked that the singer "turned heartbreak into a hit". Lyrically, the song explores some mature concepts, such as the line "you don't like me, you just like the chase." According to Kathi Kamen Goldmark of Common Sense Media, the ballad is about heartbreak and refusing to repeat the same mistake, demonstrated by the lyrics "You say you dream of my face/but you don't like me, you just like the chase…It doesn't matter anyway", with JoJo repeating the refrain "you know it's just too little, too late" several times throughout the song. Cosmopolitan's Dara Adeeyo received "Too Little Too Late" as a reminder that "relationships usually end for a reason." Writing for The Odyssey, Brandy Blaise believes the song's "powerful" moral to be about "Accepting that you deserve better and its just a little too late for your partner to fix things", demonstrated by its lyrics "Go find someone else. I'm letting you go, I'm loving myself. You got a problem but don't come asking me for help"; People's Julia Emmanuele compared this line to an Instagram caption. The Boston Globe's Maura Johnston described the song as "chiding" in tone, while Sam Willett of Consequence of Sound described its mood as "sassy" and a "slap-in-the-face".

Describing it as simultaneously "a hate track" and "a heartbreak track", Jane Hu, a music critic for Medium, compared the song to Whitney Houston's "It’s Not Right but It’s Okay" (1999) as though it "were sung by a 15-year-old." Some music journalists have speculated or not the song potentially correlates to JoJo's own dating life, particularly her relationship with athlete Freddy Adu, which ended around the time the song was released. Believing that "art predicted life" when she was first introduced to the track, JoJo explained, "when I started dating a few years later, I wondered if those songwriters hadn’t instinctively picked up on something.”

Critical reception

"Too Little Too Late" received positive reviews from music critics. Entertainment Weekly's Leah Greenblatt cited "Too Little Too Late" as an example of "the best songwriting a major-label budget can buy", while Billboard identified the song as a track "that can dwell comfortably on both the pop and AC charts", appealing to "listeners of all ages." Writing for AllMusic, Matt Collar called the single "ridiculously overwrought and utterly addictive". Similarly, Amazon.ca's Tammy La Gorce described the song as "addictive but not over-the-top". Another Billboard critic felt that the song was better than most singles playing on the radio at the time, lauding it as a track that "provides desperately needed balance to a top 40 landscape that is lacking a lot in the way of singable melodies." The writer also praised JoJo's vocal maturity, concluding, "With so many disappointing 'event' singles on the airwaves, radio needs this record." Kelefa Sanneh of The New York Times felt that "Too Little Too Late" was superior to all other tracks on its parent album. About.com's Bill Lamb was receptive towards JoJo's vocal performance, writing that the singer "provides just enough control to keep [its] sentiments ... from going overboard and, by the end of the song, proves high notes are well within her range", while selecting "Too Little Too Late" as one of the album's "Top Tracks". Contributing to Rolling Stone, music critic Jenny Eliscu wrote that the ballad demonstrates JoJo's "nuanced command of how to work an R&B; arpeggio like a pro." In another article for Rolling Stone, Robert Kemp described "Too Little Too Late" as "about as perfect a pop song as they come." Alex Macpherson from The Guardian wrote that the singer remains "at her best when compulsively dissecting emotional situations straight out of high-school movies via the medium of big, heartfelt choruses", identifying "Too Little Too Late" as a "wonderfully weepy pinnacle". Similarly, People's Oliver Jones wrote that the singer "finds her musical comfort zone" singing "Too Little Too Late". Crowning the song one of the best 10 "Feel-Good Break-Up Songs" in 2007, Slice contributor Nicolle Weeks joke that nothing is "more humbling than a twerpy 15-year-old who can concisely summarize the way I feel about my stunted relationship", citing "Boy you know all the right things to say (You know it's just too little too late)" as the track's best lyric.

In a more lukewarm review, Evan Sawdey from PopMatters described the track as "appropriately melodramatic," drawing similarities between it and JoJo's debut single "Leave (Get Out)" only "without the angry chorus". Sawdey continued, "It's something that Alanis Morissette might have recorded for her last I'm-no-longer-angry-and-therefore-am-content-with-plain-ballads album." However, the critic concluded, "As repackaged as it is, it actually has something that the rest of the album is sorely lacking: personality." Despite calling it "a slab of confident, sophisticated maturo-pop", particularly praising its refrain, Fraser M. of BBC Online felt that the song's production grows repetitive in addition to overwhelming JoJo's singing voice at times, continuing, "it is slightly disappointing that they feel the need to water down the strength of her voice to fit her into more of a Rihanna mould than an Xtina mould." However, the critic concluded that the song remains a "Catchy tune, mind, and it lends itself well to a singalong in the car". In 2007, "Too Little Too Late" earned JoJo a Boston Music Award for Female Vocalist of the Year. Cunningham won an ASCAP songwriting award for her contributions to the song.

10 years after its release, the song's reputation has endured. Medium contributor Jane Hu opined that "You could not dream up a more perfect pop track", writing "there’s something about 'Too Little Too Late' that continues to exemplify everything I want from the [pop music] genre", praising JoJo's mature vocals and the relatability of the song to anyone who becomes involved in a bad relationship between the ages of 15 and 25. Furthermore, the critic wrote that the single is "not a one-hit-wonder teen peak, but in fact, only the start of JoJo’s artistic trajectory", concluding, "After almost a decade, the prescient maturity of 'Too Little Too Late'  ... baffles me every time." Retrospectively, in 2016 Vanessa Okoth-Obbo, contributing to Pitchfork, described "Too Little Too Late" as an "excellent young love anthem". AwesomenessTV's Alexis Joy called the song "terrific" and "our go-to #Throwback song!". Entertainment.ie believes "there’s no way you didn’t love ... ‘Too Little Too Late'." back in 2006. In 2016, AXS ranked "Too Little Too Late" JoJo's seconds best song, believing that its popularity eclipsed that of "Leave (Get Out)" due to JoJo's performance and its strong message. Also that year, Capital XTRA compiled a list of tracks the radio station "23 Songs You Won't Believe Are Turning 10 Years Old". Ranking the song ninth, they wrote, "Jojo didn't stick around for too many hits, but you're kidding yourself if you try to deny that 'Too Little, Too Late' isn't an epic song." Similarly, Samara Gould of The Odyssey remarked, "Although she may be MIA today, this song was definitely a hit during the 'tween years." MTV reminisced that the song was among 16 that female listeners "Definitely Had On Your Heartbreak Playlist In 2006" whenever their significant other upset them. In 2016, GQ's Lauren Larson crowned "Too Little Too Late" the "breakup ballad of the decade." The Odyssey ranked "Too Little Too Late" their fifth most empowering break up song. Radio station KS95 placed the song at number 20 on their ranking of "The 25 Best Break Up Songs Ever". As of 2017, People felt that "Too Little Too Late" was one of the 14 most save breakup anthems ever recorded. Ranking it the 31st "Best R&B Songs by White Singers" during the 2000s, Complex's Max Goldberg crowned JoJo "the queen of angry teenage girls" due to the break up song's popularity throughout the decade. According to Louise Bruton of The Irish Times, the song proved that JoJo was capable of competing against the likes of singers Kelly Clarkson and Pink at the time of its release. In a 2017 article "Embrace your angst with the best of the 2000s",

Commercial performance
"Too Little Too Late" remains JoJo's biggest hit to-date. "Too Little Too Late" performed well on both Billboards pop and adult contemporary charts, became a staple on radio stations during 2006. "Too Little Too Late" initially debuted at number 13 on the Bubbling Under Hot 100 Singles the week of August 19, 2006, topping the chart the week after. The following week, it jumped to the Billboard Hot 100 at number 90. By its second week on the chart, "Too Little Too Late" moved from number 66 to number three due to a 121,000 increase in digital downloads, becoming the largest jump into the top-three spot in Billboard history, breaking the record previously by American singer Mariah Carey for her song "Loverboy" (2001), as well as the biggest one-week jump in the chart's history. PR Newswire anticipated that the single might even climb to the number one spot on the Hot 100. It is her first and so far only single to make it to the top 10 and the top three of the Hot 100 chart. The song remains her highest-charting single on the chart, as well as her last single to perform well on the charts; her next Hot 100 entry occurred in 2011 with the release of "Disaster", which peaked at number 87. Additionally, the song peaked at number two on Mediabase. By the week of November 11, 2006, the song became number one on AOL Music, having amassed streams surpassing 296, 676. The single has sold 821,000 digital downloads as of March 2007. By October 2011, "Too Little Too Late" had sold over one million copies, becoming a platinum-selling hit. "Too Little Too Late" has been called the artist's "standout hit" by Trent Warner of BeatRoute Magazine. Shortly after the success of "Too Little Too Late", JoJo entered a decade-long period of disputes with her then-record labels Da Family and Blackground Records, during which she struggled to release music due to contractual restrictions.

"Too Little Too Late" also achieved success worldwide, peaking within the top 10 in six other countries in addition to the United States. In the United Kingdom, the single debuted at number 22 on the UK Singles Chart based on downloads alone two weeks before its physical CD release. This is because from 2007, the United Kingdom changed charting rules and downloaded singles can enter the UK Singles Chart at any time. When the song was released to physical CD, it peaked at number four, becoming JoJo's second top five and third top 10 single in the United Kingdom.

The song was hugely successful in Australia and New Zealand, reaching the top 10 in both countries.  In the latter, 'Too Little Too Late' debuted at number 11, and reached its peak of number 5 in its 6th week.  This was JoJo's 3rd consecutive top 5 single after Leave (Get Out) (#2), and Baby It's You (#3).
Joey Guerra of the Houston Chronicle believes "Too Little Too Late" is one of the songs that " made [JoJo] a star" due to its success. Considered to be her "big break" into the music industry, the song is credited with launching Cunningham's songwriting career. As of 2016, Cunningham considers the success of "Too Little Too Late" the highlight of her career because it was her first song to achieve international success.

Music video

Background 
Originally, a contest sponsored by JoJo's label and street team would've allowed a fan onto the set of the video to interview her personally on May 19 in Los Angeles but was cancelled at the last minute. JoJo gave fans a sneak peek of the video on June 3 in a short behind the scenes segment on CD USA.

On June 11, pictures from the set of the first scenes from the video leaked onto Wireimage.com. Her RV co-star Robin Williams and his daughter Zelda appeared in the photos and in footage featured in the "Lights, Camera, Action (Behind the Scenes of the Video Shoot)" section on the Target exclusive The High Road bonus DVD. The full video can be accessed in "Visual Imagery (JoJo Videos)" on the DVD. The world premiere of "Too Little Too Late" was on July 17 on AOL Music's First View.

The music video or "Too Little Too Late" was directed by Chris Robinson, who JoJo claims had always been her first choice to direct the project; the idea to incorporate sports into the video originated from Robinson. Before deciding on soccer, which JoJo identified as one of her favorite sports, she had considered featuring American football in the video until Robinson convinced her that soccer would appeal to a more international audience due to being "the biggest sport in the world." JoJo was dating soccer player Freddy Adu at the time. Her relationship with Adu, combined with the fact that the 2006 FIFA World Cup was approaching, are believed to have inspired the music video's theme, The video was filmed in spring 2006 during the playoffs. JoJo had decided against casting a professional actor or model as her love interest in the music video, feeling that hiring an untrained performer would offer "more of a real feel to the video". Professional soccer player Mike Zaher, junior defender of the UCLA Bruins, was cast as JoJo's boyfriend David in the music video. 21 years-old and a sophomore at the University of California, Los Angeles at the time, Zaher learned that an unnamed celebrity and her film crew would be filming his team, the UCLA Bruins, practicing soccer from coach Jorge Salcedo; the teammates had initially been told that they would be involved in an upcoming music video for actress Lindsay Lohan, and JoJo's identity was not revealed until after the team had been brought to a studio, where the project was further explained to them. The athletes found the process quite enjoyable and not as "uptight and intense as they thought it might be at first". After soccer practice, a casting director invited Zaher to remain on set later to read a few lines into the camera. Although he still had little to no idea about what the project was, he was given the impression that the producer might like him. Afterward, Zaher learned that he was competing against other actors for the male lead but he had the support of JoJo herself. The following day, the director informed Zaher that JoJo had personally selected him to play the role of her boyfriend in the video.

JoJo and Zaher spent three days traveling around Los Angeles filming various scenes for the music video. The soccer scenes were filmed at East Los Angeles College's football stadium, while other scenes were split between Universal Studios and a home in Hollywood, California, which was located near Highway 10. Zaher described the filming process as "pretty intense", recalling that he and JoJo spent much time taking pictures wearing different clothing to give off the impression that they had been a couple for quite some time, in addition to visiting various tourist attractions. The on-screen couple's relationship continued into a friendship off-set, during which Zaher and JoJo would go to movies and restaurants during her time in Los Angeles. Despite initially negotiating to be paid $8,000 for his contributions to the music video, Zaher was ultimately not allowed to accept payment due to National Collegiate Athletic Association (NCAA) rules at the time, which prohibited him from accepting any soccer-related payment. Zaher claims that the film crew acted even kinder towards both him and his team after learning that they would not be getting paid for their work. The video premiered on MTV and BET in fall 2006.

Synopsis and reception
At the start of the video, JoJo witnesses David (Zaher) flirting with a blonde-haired girl at a party while holding a glass drink in his hand. The couple talk and David finally invites JoJo to go to an important soccer game for his team this Saturday. As the song begins, it shows JoJo spending much of her time staring outside through her bedroom window, pondering the situation as rain falls. She walks around the room looking at photos, reminiscing about the time they spent together and how generally ungrateful he was. These shots are intercut with David playing at the important soccer game. At one point, David declines a phone call from JoJo before proceeding to flirt with other girls at a party. In the video's finale, rain begins to pour on the game. During the video, JoJo is seen throwing out a giant teddy bear, getting rid of pictures of her and her ex-beau and even singing in the pouring rain. It is raining, proving that this is the same moment as the game and she has chosen not to attend. David's team is down one goal with 2:14 seconds remaining in the second half. He ends up missing a crucial goal and was blocked by UCLA goalkeeper Eric Conner. David is not quick enough, failing to score the tying goal and the game ends. He then learns that JoJo had decided not to attend the game to which she had been invited in the first place. The video ends with the camera zooming out and panning away from JoJo's window as the rain subsides.

Noticeable in the video is a poster for the Rockcorps Boost Mobile concert at Radio City Music Hall on September 24, 2005, an ad for Q-Tip's single "For the Nasty", and the book "Riding on a Blue Note: Jazz and American Pop" by Gary Giddins, which she is reading on top of the car at the game. The fountain in front of the Universal City Hard Rock Cafe is also visible. AllMusic's Matt Collar wrote that the video demonstrates JoJo's "suburban cheerleader slinging hip-hop attitude", comparing her persona to those of actress Jennifer Aniston and singer Beyoncé.

The video for "Too Little Too Late" premiered in the United Kingdom on October 14, 2006, on The Box's Kopooka Hot. "Too Little Too Late" was released on CD on January 8, 2007, in the United Kingdom. The song was added to Radio 1's playlist, under the C-list on November 29, 2006, and was upgraded to the B-list at a later date. By October 2006, the music video had been number one on iTunes, Yahoo and AOL. The video also peaked at number two on TRL, after premiering at number 9.

JoJo and Adu ended their relationship shortly after the video was released, although both parties have denied rumors that the music video's plot had anything to do with this. Following its release and popularity, Zaher found that he could not escape the video nor the song. Fellow UCLA teammates, athletes, opposing soccer teams and fans have constantly made fun of his appearance in the video during soccer matches since its release, to the point of which the video was played during half-time at one particular game in Maryland. He explained, "You'd think after four or five years people would forget it, but they don't ... I guess I'm just going to have to live with it the rest of my life." Despite this, Zaher does not regret participating in the video, insisting that it was a "great experience". He believes the people who tease him are merely jealous and wish they were in his position at the time, and admitting that he and JoJo have kept in touch as of 2011.

Live performances and covers 
JoJo's first scheduled performance of the single was during the Miss Teen USA 2006, which aired on August 15, 2006. On October 17, 2006, the singer performed "Too Little Too Late" live on both The Today Show and TRL. This was followed by a series of performances to promote both the song and The High Road between October and November 2006: Live with Regis and Kelly (October 18), The Tonight Show with Jay Leno (October 20), The Ellen DeGeneres Show (October 25), The Megan Mullally Show (October 27), The View (November 7), CD USA, Sessions@AOL and Music Choice.

In June 2011, JoJo performed "Too Little Too Late" at the Girls Who Rock benefit concert. JoJo included the song in her set list of her 2015 "I Am JoJo Tour". Mehek Seyid, a writer for Live in Limbo, reviewed the singer's rendition at the Mod Club in Toronto as "performed ... with the same self-affirming attitude and confidence that defined the Billboard hit[ when it] first circulated in the 2000s." In January 2017, JoJo sang verses of "Too Little Too Late" with elementary school choir the PS22 Chorus. Upon being published on the choir's YouTube channel, the video became a viral sensation. JoJo also performed the song throughout her "Mad Love Tour". Reviewing her performance at the O2 Academy Islington, her first performance in the United Kingdom in 10 years, Attitude wrote that JoJo's rendition of "Too Little Too Late" is a "reminder of the pipes that made JoJo one of pop's most promising young stars". The Atlanta Journal-Constitution Jewel Wicker called her live rendition one of the show's "great moments". Erica Thompson, associate editor for Columbus Alive, reviewed that the song "held up well over time". Despite sounding "nursery-rhyme catchy, [it was] written for a sophisticated singer, which JoJo proved to be even as a teenager", which Thompson believes her contemporaries would struggle to replicate.

In late October 2007, Daniel Rossen of Grizzly Bear recorded a version of the song in honor of bandmate Ed Droste's 29th birthday. Musician Daniel Rossen, one of the two lead vocalists of the band Grizzly Bear, covered "Too Little Too Late" live in concert in February 2009. Bandmate Ed Droste's wanted Rossen to deliver the cover "very seriously, as if he really meant all those lyrics". Stereogum described Rossen's rendition as "great, dusty and hazy and hooky". Sam Willett of Consequence of Sound reviewed Rossen's version as "a killer cover" that has been arranged "into a simultaneously soothing and haunting collage of echoing harmonies and guitar textures." According to The Guardian music critic Jude Rogers, the cover was part of the band's effort to make their live performances more enjoyable to audiences "when you're a man in your late 20s who can't hide behind a persona." The company Wavegroup did a cover of the song for the game Karaoke Revolution Presents: American Idol Encore.

This song was covered and used in Dance Dance Revolution Hottest Party by the artist Okokoro. The song as played in the game is much shorter and speeds up during the choruses. The song was also sampled by electronic music producer Daniel Lopatin on the third track of his studio album, Chuck Person's Eccojams Vol. 1, which seamlessly loops an excerpt of the song's hook.

Track listings
UK and Australian CD single
"Too Little Too Late" (album version) – 3:39
"Get It Poppin'" – 3:41

German CD single
"Too Little Too Late" – 3:47
"Too Little Too Late" (Full Phatt Remix) (featuring Tah Mac) – 4:24
"Too Little Too Late" (Full Phatt Remix) – 3:53
"Too Little Too Late" (instrumental) – 3:47
"Too Little Too Late" (video) – 4:04

Credits and personnel
Credits adapted from the liner notes of The High Road''.

 JoJo – backing vocals, lead vocals, vocal arrangement
 Robbie Nevil - background vocals
 Hayden Panettiere - background vocals
 Jason Weaver - background vocals
 Josh Alexander – production, recording, songwriting
 Ruth-Anne Cunningham – songwriting
 Paul Foley – recording
 Gene Grimaldi – mastering
 Vincent Herbert – production
 Katia Lewin – engineering assistance
 Dave Russell – mixing
 Billy Steinberg – production, songwriting

Charts

Weekly charts

Year-end charts

Certifications

Release history

References

External links
 

2000s ballads
2006 singles
2006 songs
Blackground Records singles
JoJo (singer) songs
Music videos directed by Chris Robinson (director)
Pop ballads
Contemporary R&B ballads
Song recordings produced by Billy Steinberg
Songs written by Billy Steinberg
Songs written by Josh Alexander
Songs written by RuthAnne
Universal Motown Records singles